Portland Club may refer to:

Portland Club (London)
Portland Club (Portland, Maine)